Ulsta is a village in the south-west of the island of Yell, Shetland, Scotland. North Ness Hall is the local community facility. The car ferry to Toft on Mainland, Shetland leaves from here.

References
 Overview of Ulsta, Gazetteer for Scotland

External links

Canmore - Yell, Ulsta, Chapel and Burial-Ground site record
Canmore - Yell, Ulsta site record

Villages in Yell, Shetland